Duniyadari is a 2017 Gujarati movie a remake of Marathi movie Duniyadari produced by Tajdar Amrohi and Riyaz Balooch and directed by Shital Shah. Duniyadari is a story of love, friendship, relationship and destiny based in the period of mid 70s. The story conveys the emotions of the youth and their romantic journeys plus what that the destiny has in store for them. The film stars Malhar Thakar and Esha Kansara are in the lead role.

Cast 
 Malhar Thakar as Meet Mehta
 Esha Kansara as Kavita Zaveri
 Aarjav Trivedi as Dharmesh Shankarbhai Patel
 Mamta Chaudhary as Amita Kala
 Tarika Tripathi as Shilpa Patel
 Shaunak Vyas as Dushyant Dhebar
 Parikshit Tamaliya as Krunal Zaveri
 Rajan Thakar as Manoj
 Kishan Gadhvi as Sorry
 Sanjay Galsar as paraag
 Hemang Shah as Jignesh

Production

Release 
The film is released on 17 February 2017.

References

External links
 

2017 films
Films shot in India
Films shot in Gujarat
Gujarati remakes of Marathi films
Indian drama films
2010s Gujarati-language films